Boccia will be contested at the 2011 Parapan American Games from November 13 to 16 at the Revolución Gym in Guadalajara, Mexico.

Medal summary

Medal table

Medal events

External links
2011 Parapan American Games – Boccia

Events at the 2011 Parapan American Games